Chutove is an urban-type settlement and the administrative center of  Poltava Raion of Poltava Oblast in Ukraine. In is located on the Kolomak, the left tributary of the Vorskla, in the drainage basin of the Dnieper. Population:

Economy

Transportation
The settlement is on Highway M03 connecting Kyiv and Kharkiv via Poltava.

The closest railway station is in Skorokhodove, on the railway connecting Poltava and Kharkiv.

References

Urban-type settlements in Poltava Raion
Poltavsky Uyezd